Yuri Konstantinovich Shafranik (born February 27, 1952) is an entrepreneur, public figure, expert on the energy sector and Doctor of Economics.

Yuri Shafranik is the chairman of the board of the Union of Oil and Gas producers of Russia, chairman of the Committee on Energy Strategy and the development of the fuel and energy complex of the Chamber of Commerce and Industry of the Russian Federation, and a co-chair of Russian delegation to the Dartmouth Conferences.

Education 
Born in a worker’s family in the Siberian village of Karasul (Tyumen Oblast), Yuri Shafranik graduated from Tyumen State Oil and Gas University in 1974 with a degree in electrical engineering of automation and remote-control systems. He earned his second degree in 1980 from the same university, majoring in mining engineering technology and the complex mechanization of oil and gas fields. Yuri Sharanik then received his Doctor of Economics degree in 2006.

Early career 
Shafranik began his career while still studying and he made a successful industrial career in the oil industry of the former Soviet Union, moving from a locksmith to the general director of the Langepasneftegaz one of the largest oil producers of the time. Shafranik also remained active outside of his existing achievements and in 1990, he was elected Chairman of the Tyumen Regional Council of People’s Deputies in an alternative election.

In September 1991 Shafranik was appointed Head of the Administration (Governor) of the Tyumen Region. During that period as Governor of the Tyumen Region, Yuri Shafranik  became one of the initiators and authors of the Law "On Subsoil".

In 1993 Shafranik was appointed the Minister of Energy of the Russian Federation, a post he held for three years until 1996. While being the Minister of Energy he promoted the adoption of the Law on Production Sharing Agreements (1995).

Energy Minister Shafranik was one of the initiators of the creation of and actively participated in, the work of the Russian-American Intergovernmental Commission (Gore-Chernomyrdin Commission). The energy agreements and policies of the Gore-Chernomyrdin Commission were supported by Energy Minister Hazel R. O'Leary and Energy Minister Yuri Shafranik.

Business 
Following those years as Energy Minister, Shafranik then returned to business and in 1997, founded the Central Fuel Company. The Central Fuel Company became a member of the Inam international project in partnership with SOCAR, Amoco, Monument Oil & Gas, which was sold to Shell for $18 mln.

In 2000 Yuri Shafranik went on to found international investment group of companies, SoyuzNefteGaz, where he serves as Chairman. The Group completed projects in over 20 countries ranging from oil and gas exploration and production to provision of oil and gas field services and construction. SoyuzNefteGaz was a $1.5 bln. – net return on invested capital and 1 bln. toe. - total volume of commercial hydrocarbon reserves were developed with the participation of the Group.

Yuri Shafranik was director of the First Calgary Petroleums LTD from 2003 until 2008, when Italian oil giant Eni SpA agreed to buy Canadian First Calgary Petroleums Ltd for $923 mln.

Public activity 
Shafranik leads an active public life: he was among the initiators of the creation of new types of public organizations: the Union of Oil and Gas Producers of Russia and the Supreme Mining Council. Shafranik remains publicly active and is co-chair of the re-energized Dartmouth Conference.

The Russian Union of Industrialists and Entrepreneurs is another public group that, since 2000, Shafranik has lent his support to. Another responsibility that Shafranik holds, is as Chairman of the Supreme Mining Council, a role he has held since 2002.

With Russia and Global energy developments at the forefront of Shafranik’s mind, he was welcomed as the Chairman of the Committee on Energy Strategy and Development of the Fuel and Energy Complex.

Dartmouth Conferences 
The Dartmouth Conferences is a dialogue between Russian and American citizens aimed at finding areas of common ground between the two countries in the fields of politics, science, education and culture. It was created in 1960, with regular conferences running through until 1990. The conferences were renewed in 2014 and since 2015, Yuri Shafranik has been a co-chair of the Russian delegation.

Works 
 Eurasian Energy Civilization. Regarding “Future Energy” // Moscow, ENERGY Publishing Centre, 2017.       
 Russia's Oil-and-Gas Sector - Difficult Road to Diversity Yuriy Shafranik, Valeriy Kryukov  (Moscow, 2016)
 Fuel and Energy Complex and Economy of Russia: Yesterday, Today, Tomorrow (1990-2010-2030) Under the editorship of Yu.K. Shafranik Bushuev. Authors: V.V., Gromov A.I., Kryukov V.A., Kurichev N.K., Mastepanov A.M., Troitskiy A.A., Shafranik Yu.K. Moscow, ENERGY Publishing Centre

References

External links
 Official website

1952 births
Living people
Russian businesspeople in the oil industry
Governors of Tyumen Oblast
Members of the Federation Council of Russia (1994–1996)
Energy ministers of Russia